Zuraini Khalid is a Malaysian female international lawn bowler.

Bowls career
Khalid won a silver medal in the women's pairs (with Nor Hashimah Ismail) at the 2010 Commonwealth Games in Delhi. Two years later she won another silver medal but this time at the 2012 World Outdoor Bowls Championship, in the fours event with (Auni Fathiah Kamis, Nur Fidrah Noh and Azlina Arshad) which was held in Adelaide, Australia.

In 2016, she won the Hong Kong International Bowls Classic singles title and finished runner up in the pairs and in 2017, won a gold medal in the Lawn bowls at the Southeast Asian Games.

References 

Malaysian female bowls players
Living people
1987 births
Commonwealth Games medallists in lawn bowls
Commonwealth Games silver medallists for Malaysia
Southeast Asian Games medalists in lawn bowls
Southeast Asian Games gold medalists for Malaysia
Bowls players at the 2010 Commonwealth Games
Competitors at the 2017 Southeast Asian Games
Competitors at the 2019 Southeast Asian Games
Southeast Asian Games bronze medalists for Malaysia
21st-century Malaysian women
Medallists at the 2010 Commonwealth Games